The Key is a 1965 Croatian omnibus film. It consists of three segments directed by Vanča Kljaković, Krsto Papić and Antun Vrdoljak.

Sources
 Ključ at hrfilm.hr

External links

1965 films
Croatian anthology films
1960s Croatian-language films
Yugoslav drama films
Jadran Film films
Films directed by Krsto Papić
Films directed by Antun Vrdoljak
Croatian black-and-white films
Yugoslav black-and-white films
Films set in Yugoslavia